Untold: The Greatest Sports Stories Never Told is an original one-hour documentary series featuring some of sports' most compelling figures and the challenges they've endured. It was hosted by Marv Albert. The series aired on Spike TV from 2004 to 2005.

Opening sequence

Episode list
 "Terry Bradshaw" – November 12, 2004
 "Bo Jackson" – November 19, 2004
 "Darryl Strawberry" – December 3, 2004
 "Harwood Dreams: Ten Years Later" – December 10, 2004
 "Ricky Williams" – January 7, 2005
 "The Smashing Machine" – January 14, 2005
 "Testosterone Boys" – January 28, 2005
 "Laird Hamilton" – February 4, 2005
 "Isiah Thomas" – February 11, 2005

External links
 

American sports television series
2004 American television series debuts
2005 American television series endings
2000s American documentary television series
Spike (TV network) original programming